Jugge Nohall, born Mark Erik Jörgen Nohall, September 6, 1964 in Stockholm, is a Swedish singer and artist, who has written a song for the Swedish national final of the Eurovision song contest, participated in two reality shows (Club Goa) on Swedish television and worked as a radio talkshow host.

References

External links

Swedish artists
Swedish male singers
1964 births
Living people